APNA Channel, is a Urdu language satellite television channel broadcasting from Pakistan. It was launched on 14 October 2004. It also broadcasts English-language programs dubbed in Punjabi. Later in 2020, channel started airing Urdu language programs. APNA Channel is part of the APNA TV Network which also include the news channel Abb Takk News.

Viewership 
The major target viewership of APNA Channel include Pakistan as Urdu language is spoken and understood  by much of the population of Pakistan. The Channel is also targeting the Pakistani communities from the South Asia, settled in Europe, Middle East, the Persian Gulf region, Far east, Africa and Australia. APNA TV has many viewers across Pakistan.

Availability

APNA Channel HD is available on satellite via Pak site 38 e as well as from cable TV operators all around Pakistan. APNA Channel is also available on PTCL Smart IPTV.

Mission

The channel's mission is to become a channel of happenings and events narrowing the rural and urban gap in the society.

Currently programs

Drama 
Aik Sitam Aur
PagalPan
Ek Adhuri Larki
Kaanto Se Kheech Ke Ye Aanchal
Humraaz
Pari Hoon Main
Mere Khawabon Ka Shehzada

Comedy Sitcoms 
Ulta Seedha
Ab Kiya Hoga

Former programs

Traveling shows 

 Travel And Science
 Apna On Karachi Street
 Mind Travels
 Aana On Karachi Street
 Apna Dubai

Lifestyle
 Getting Personal With Bollywood Stars
 Apna Ajuba
 Yes you are Beautiful
 Overhaulin' My Ride
 Fifa Legends

Comedy 
 Comedy Hour With Kader Khan
 Apna Whatsapp
 Lahori 
 Apna Cinema

See also 
 List of Television Stations in Pakistan
 List of news channels in Pakistan
 Television in Pakistan

References

External links
 Homepage, Official Website, Retrieved 16 Dec 2016

Television channels and stations established in 2004
Television stations in Pakistan
Mass media companies of Pakistan